WFXM (107.1 FM) is a radio station serving the Macon, Georgia area with a mainstream urban format. This station is licensed to Georgia Radio Alliance, LLC.

External links
Power 107.1 Facebook

FXM
Mainstream urban radio stations in the United States
Radio stations established in 1985
1985 establishments in Georgia (U.S. state)